"Get Down Low" is a song by English record producer TC. It was released on 26 November 2013 through Skrillex's record label Owsla. It entered the UK Singles Chart at number 183.

Background and release
The song is inspired by a crowd TC performed to in Romania. Casswell sent the demo version of the song to Skrillex in early 2013. Skrillex liked the song and asked TC to release an EP on his vanity record label Owsla. The song premiered on 17 March 2013 during Dog Blood's Ultra Music Festival set. 1Xtra DJ and drum and bass producer Friction played the song frequently during his 2013 live sets. Shortly before release, on 13 November 2013, it was made Zane Lowe's Hottest Record in the World for the week and received extensive airplay on the likes of BBC Radio 1 and 1Xtra.

Music video
The music video for the song was released onto the UKF Drum & Bass YouTube channel on 25 November 2013 and lasts a total length of three minutes and twenty-seven seconds.

Track listing

Notes
"Do You Rock?" was remastered for release on the EP after being released as a single on 21 October 2012.

Chart performance

Weekly charts

References

2013 songs
2013 singles
Drum and bass songs